Chloroclystis fragilis is a moth in the  family Geometridae. It is found in New Guinea (it was described from Saint Aignan Island).

References

Moths described in 1899
Chloroclystis
Moths of New Guinea